Mercury & Lightning is the sixth studio album by American Christian singer and songwriter John Mark McMillan, released on September 1, 2017, through Lionhawk Records. The album includes singles "Wilderlove", "No Country", and "Enemy, love."

Background and recording 
Mercury & Lightning was produced by Gabriel Wilson and recorded at Feng Way Studio in Vancouver, WA and Bright City Studios in Charlotte, NC. The album was engineered by Aaron Knott, mixed by Chad Howat, and mastered by Jonathan Berlin.

Promotion 
McMillan embarked on the "Mercury & Lightning Tour 2017" with Kings Kaleidoscope and LaPeer, performing at a variety of locations across the United States.

Commercial performance and critical reception 

Mercury & Lightning peaked at No. 1 on the Billboard Top Christian Albums chart, and also charted outside of the Christian music realm, reaching No. 44 on the Top Rock Albums chart and No. 39 on the Top Album Sales chart. The album was received well by reviewing critics, though it received little critical attention.

Track listing

References

2017 albums
John Mark McMillan albums